Internet censorship in South Korea is prevalent, and contains some unique elements such as the blocking of pro-North Korea websites, and to a lesser extent, Japanese websites, which led to it being categorized as "pervasive" in the conflict/security area by OpenNet Initiative. South Korea is also one of the few developed countries where pornography is largely illegal, with the exception of social media websites which are a common source of legal pornography in the country. Any and all material deemed "harmful" or subversive by the state is censored. The country also has a "cyber defamation law", which allow the police to crack down on comments deemed "hateful" without any reports from victims, with citizens being sentenced for such offenses.

From 1995 to 2002, the government of South Korea passed the Telecommunications Business Act (TBA), the first internet censorship law in the world. Passing of the act lead to the establishment of the Internet Communications Ethics Committee (ICEC), which would monitor the Internet and make recommendations for content to be removed. The ICEC pursued criminal prosecutions of those who made unlawful statements and blocked several foreign websites. In the first eight months of 1996, the ICEC took down roughly 220,000 messages on Internet sites.

From 2002 to 2008, the government passed a revision of the TBA legislation. This allowed the ICEC to engage in more sophisticated internet policing and other bureaucratic entities to monitor the Internet for illegal speech or take down websites that violated the laws. During this time, there was political drive to increase extensive internet censorship, in part as a response to cases of suicide associated with online rumors. In 2007, over 200,000 incidents of cyberbullying were reported.

In 2008, the election of President Lee Myung-bak was followed by the inauguration of major increases in broadcast censorship. The South Korean government passed a law that created a new agency called the Korea Communications Standards Commission (KCSC) to replace the ICEC, becoming the new South Korean Internet regulation and censorship body. The first major change by the Lee Myung-bak government was to require websites with over 100,000 daily visitors to make their users register their real name and social security numbers. A second change made by the government was to allow KCSC to suspend or delete any web posting or articles for 30 days as soon as a complaint is filed. The reason for the new law was to combat cyberbullying in South Korea. Every week, portions of the South Korean web are taken down by the KCSC. In 2013, around 23,000 South Korean webpages were deleted and another 63,000 blocked by the KCSC.

South Korea's government maintains a broad-ranging approach toward the regulation of specific online content and imposes a substantial level of censorship on election-related discourse and on many websites that the government deems subversive or socially harmful. Such policies are particularly pronounced with regard to anonymity on the Internet. The OpenNet Initiative classifies Internet censorship in South Korea as pervasive in the conflict/security area, as selective in the social area, with fewer evidence of filtering in the political and Internet tools areas. In 2011 South Korea was included on Reporters Without Borders list of countries Under Surveillance. This designation persisted in 2012, shared with Russia and Egypt among other countries. Freedom House has also reported that online harassment, particularly newer, digitally mediated forms of violence against women has continued.

In 2019, the South Korean government announced that it would use SNI snooping to censor HTTPS websites. This was met with strong opposition, with more than 230,000 South Korean citizens signing a petition to protest the measure, but the opposition was disregarded by the government.  The South Korean government defended its decision by stating that the Korea Communications Standards Commission was an independent commission, a claim which turned out to be false, as most members of the commission were appointed by the president of the country.

Relevant laws
During the military dictatorships of Park Chung-hee and Chun Doo-hwan (1961-1987), anti-government speech was frequently suppressed with reference to the National Security Act (NSA, 1948) and the Basic Press Law (1980). Although the Basic Press Law was abolished in 1987, the NSA remains in effect. The government has used other "dictatorship-era" laws in order to prosecute critics in contemporary contexts; for example a law against the spreading of "false rumors" was used to charge a teenage protester during the 2008 US beef protest in South Korea.

According to the Telecommunication Business Law, three government agencies in South Korea have responsibility for Internet surveillance and censorship: the Broadcasting Regulation Committee, the Korea Media Rating Board, and the Korea Internet Safety Commission (KISCOM, 2005). KISCOM censors the Internet through orders to internet service providers to block access to "subversive communication", "materials harmful to minors", "cyber defamation", "sexual violence", "cyber stalking", and "pornography and nudity". Regulators have blocked or removed 15,000 Internet posts in 2008, and over 53,000 in 2011.

In April 2020, the national assembly passed a bill to handle the culprits of digital sex crimes. According to the bill, those who purchase, sell or watch media graphics of non-consensual sexual activity will be jailed for up to 3 years or fined up to 3 million Won (US$2,600).

Political censorship
Freedom to criticize government leaders, policies, and the military is limited to the extent that it "endangers national security" or is considered by censors to be "cyber defamation". The government has cited "character assassinations and suicides caused by excessive insults, [and] the spreading of false rumors and defamation" to justify its censorship.

In May 2002, KISCOM shut down the anti-conscription website non-serviam on the grounds that it "denied the legitimacy" of the South Korean military. The Navy of South Korea accused an activist of criminal libel when he criticized plans to build a controversial naval base in the country.

The government has deleted the Twitter account of a user who cursed the president, and a judge who wrote critically about the President's Internet censorship policies was fired. In 2010, the Prime Minister's Office authorized surveillance on a civilian who satirized President Lee Myung-bak.

In 2007, numerous bloggers were censored and their posts deleted by police for expressing criticism of, or even support for, presidential candidates. This even led to some bloggers being arrested by the police. Subsequently, in 2008, just before a new presidential election, new legislation that required all major Internet portal sites to require identity verification of their users was put into effect. This applies to all users who add any publicly viewable content. For example, to post a comment on a news article, a user registration and citizen identity number verification is required. For foreigners who do not have such numbers, a copy of passport must be faxed and verified. Although this law was initially met with public outcry, as of 2008, most of the major portals, including Daum, Naver, Nate, and Yahoo Korea, enforce such verification before the user can post any material that is publicly viewable. YouTube refused to conform to the law, instead opting to disable the commenting feature on its Korean site.

Discussion about North Korea

South Korea has banned at least 65 sites considered sympathetic to North Korea through the use of IP blocking. Most North Korean websites are hosted overseas in the United States, Japan and China. Critics say that the only practical way of blocking a webpage is by denying its IP address, and since many of the North Korean sites are hosted on large servers together with hundreds of other sites, the number of real blocked pages increases significantly. Estimates are that over 3,000 additional webpages are rendered inaccessible.

Three days later, Internet providers in South Korea were ordered by the National Police Agency, National Intelligence Service (NIS) and the Ministry of Information and Communication (MIC) to block connections to the site, as well as more than 30 others, including Minjok Tongshin, Choson Sinbo, Chosun Music, North Korea Info Bank, DPRK Stamp and Uriminzokkiri.

In September 2007, Democratic Labor Party activist Kim Kang-pil was sentenced to one year in prison for discussing North Korea on the party's website.

In 2008, five South Koreans were arrested for distributing pro-North material online.

In August 2010, the South Korean government blocked a Twitter account operated by the North.

In January 2011, a South Korean man was arrested for praising North Korea through social networking sites. That same year another South Korean was arrested for posting 300 messages and 6 videos of pro-North content and sentenced to 10 months in jail. A further 83 South Koreans were arrested for distributing pro-North material on the Internet.

In January 2012, a South Korean freedom-of-speech activist was arrested for reblogging a post from a North Korean Twitter account.

South Korean president Lee Myung-bak's 2011 policies included cracking down on pro-North Korean comments on social network sites like Facebook and Twitter. Reporters Without Borders noted that the government "[had] intensified" its campaign to censor pro-North Korea material in 2012 as well.

In 2018, a South Korean man was arrested for demanding abolishment of the National Security Law and praising North Korea. He was sentenced to one year in prison.

Nudity and obscenity

The Government of South Korea practiced censorship of gay-content websites from 2001 to 2003, through its Information and Communications Ethics Committee (정보통신윤리위원회), an official organ of the Ministry of Information and Communication, under its category of "obscenity and perversion"; for example, it shut down the website ex-zone, a website about gay and lesbian issues, in 2001.  That practice has since been reversed.

Since 2008, attempts by anybody to access "indecent Internet sites" featuring unrated games, pornography, gambling, etc., are automatically redirected to a warning page which states "This site is legally blocked by the government regulations."

Search engines are required to verify age for some keywords deemed inappropriate for minors. For such keywords, age verification using a national identity number is required. For foreigners, a copy of their passport must be faxed for age verification. As of 2008, practically all large search engine companies in South Korea, including foreign-owned companies (e.g. Yahoo! Korea), have complied with this legislation. In April 2009 when the Communication Commission ordered user verification be put on the system at YouTube, Google Korea blocked video uploading from users whose country setting is Korean. In September 2012, Google re-enabled YouTube uploads in Korea following a three-year block.

On December 21, 2010, the Korea Communications Commission announced that it planned to create guidelines about monitoring Internet content in case of a tense political situation, such as automatically deleting any online anti-government message.

Criticism
The 2009 modification of the copyright law of South Korea introducing the three strikes policy has generated criticism, including regarding Internet freedoms and censorship. Tens of thousands of Korean Internet users have been disconnected from the Internet after not three, but one strike.

On September 6, 2011, the Electronic Frontier Foundation criticized the Korea Communications Standards Commission for proposing censorship and restriction on the blog of an Internet free speech activist, Dr. Gyeong-sin Park. The United Nations Human Rights Council's Special Rapporteur on Freedom of Expression warned South Korea's government about its censorship, noting among other things that South Korea's defamation laws are often used to punish statements "that are true and are in the public interest".

Korean officials' rhetoric about censored material, including that it is "subversive", "illegal", "harmful" or related to "pornography and nudity", has been noted as similar to that of their Chinese counterparts. Critics also say that the government takes prohibitions on profanity as "a convenient excuse to silence critics" and chill speech.

South Korean conservative media outlets loyal to the Lee Myung-bak government are accused of advocating further Internet censorship, because the Internet is the main source of information for progressive South Korean youths.

See also

 Censorship of Japanese media in South Korea
 Copyright law of South Korea
 
 Smart Sheriff, a South Korean parental monitoring mobile application.
 Web compatibility issues in South Korea

References

External links
 Warning - Prevention of illegal and harmful information
 South Korea country report, OpenNet Initiative, 6 August 2012

 
Korea, South
Korea, South
Censorship in South Korea
Human rights abuses in South Korea
Internet in South Korea